Susan Anne Humphreys (born October 30, 1975 in Moose Jaw, Saskatchewan) is a Canadian former competitive figure skater. She is the 1997 Canadian national champion and competed at the 1994 Winter Olympics. She now resides in Edmonton, Alberta and has three children.

Competitive highlights
GP: Champions Series (Grand Prix)

References

 
 

Canadian female single skaters
Figure skaters at the 1994 Winter Olympics
Olympic figure skaters of Canada
Living people
1975 births
Sportspeople from Moose Jaw